Tees Valley is a mayoral combined authority and Local enterprise partnership area in northern England, around the River Tees. The area is not a geographical valley. 

The LEP was established in 2011 and the combined authority was established in 2016, the latter after public consultation in 2015. The area covers five council areas: Darlington, Hartlepool, Middlesbrough, Redcar and Cleveland and Stockton-on-Tees. Administrating the area is the Tees Valley Combined Authority, consisting of a mayor and six selected chairs; local enterprise partnership chair and a chair for each unitary authority. 

The town of Middlesbrough is the largest population centre in the area.

Before the region, from 1968 until 1974, parts of the area had been under the County Borough of Teesside council area. This was replaced by Cleveland county, it consisted of four districts which become unitary authorities after the county was abolished in 1996. The Darlington district in the Durham county council area became a unitary authority in 1997.

Background

The River Tees's geographical valley is traditionally known as Teesdale. For centuries, north Tees was under the Prince-bishopric of Durham the both Darlington and Stockton had ancient wards. Middleton-st-George, Hartlepool and Billingham were in Stockton ward, the latter two were also in a district called Hartness. South Tees was under a wapentake called Langbaurgh, also known as Cleveland in Yorkshire's North Riding.

Urban (such as Eston, Billingham and Saltburn and Marske by the Sea) and parts of rural districts as well as municipal (such as Stockton-on-Tees, Thornaby-on-Tees and Redcar) and county boroughs (Middlesbrough) were merged into the County Borough of Teesside in 1968. In 1974, the county borough was disbanded.

During the 1974 reforms created the county of Cleveland including Hartlepool, Guisborough and other areas. Four boroughs were also created. 

Local government reorganisation in 1996 saw the county of Cleveland broken up with the boroughs becoming unitary authorities. The boroughs were placed into the counties of North Yorkshire and County Durham for ceremonial purposes. In 1997, the Borough of Darlington also transferred to a unitary authority structure.

Governance

UK Parliament
Tees Valley is divided into seven and a part UK parliamentary borough constituencies:
Darlington
Hartlepool
Middlesbrough
Middlesbrough South and East Cleveland
Redcar
Sedgefield (shared with the North East Combined Authority)
Stockton North
Stockton South
Each constituency is made up of wards. Four constituencies are held by the Conservative Party after the 2019 general election, up by three since the 2017 general election. This was expanded to five after the 2021 Hartlepool by-election. Labour hold the other two. Sedgefield's partial seat is also represented by a Conservative MP, as of the 2019 election. The two Middlesbrough seats have the largest majorities for either party. The Middlesbrough Constituency has a sizeable Labour majority whereas the Middlesbrough South and East Cleveland Constituency has a strong Conservative majority.

Authorities

Tees Valley Combined Authority has its headquarters at Cavendish House, Thornaby. The area has 5 borough councils, each council has a representative in the combined authority. The TVCA, amends the mayor's annual budget (by two-thirds majority). It does not have the power to block the mayor's directives.

Mayors
The Mayor of Tees Valley is a directly elected politician who, along with the Combined Authority, is responsible for the strategic government of Tees Valley. There are other mayors for the boroughs of Middlesbrough and Stockton-on-Tees. Hartlepool also had a Mayor from 2002 to 2013.

The current Tees Valley Mayor is Ben Houchen. The Mayor is responsible for Tees Valley's strategic planning and is required to produce or amend a plan for each electoral cycle.

Lord Lieutenants
Two Lord Lieutenants (Durham and North Yorkshire) are appointed by the borough's ceremonial counties.

Economy

The following is a chart of the Gross Value Added to the UK economy by the Tees Valley Combined Authority region, aggregated by industry.

Enterprise zone
The Tees Valley Enterprise Zone is an enterprise zone which encourages industrial development. It was initiated by the local enterprise partnership Tees Valley Unlimited and its creation was announced by the government in 2011. At its launch, the zone contained 12 sites. Four of these sites offer enhanced capital allowances, aimed at large manufacturers. These sites are Wilton International and South Bank Wharf, both in Redcar and Cleveland, Port Estates in Hartlepool and New Energy and Technology Park in Billingham, Stockton-on-Tees. The remaining sites offer reduced business rates. In March 2015 the government announced that a thirteenth site is to be added, South Bank Wharf Prairie, aimed at oil and gas decommissioning business.

Businesses

Imperial Chemical Industries (ICI) operated here until the late 1990s on three chemical sites at Wilton, Billingham and Seal Sands. ICI was broken up, and its many chemical manufacturing units are now operated by a large number of companies that have acquired its assets. The Centre for Process Innovation (CPI), a national innovation catapult, is based at the Wilton Centre, the former corporate headquarters of ICI, which has become a multi-company research and development centre: along with CPI there are now some 60 other companies, including the cluster body NEPIC, using these R&D and business development facilities. This centre is now one of Europe's largest R&D facilities focusing on developments in the chemistry-based process industries. The area is a chemicals processing area, but recently it has diversified to become the UK's leading site for renewable biofuel research. This industrial activity is taking place in a collaborative environment facilitated by the economic cluster body, the North East of England Process Industry Cluster (NEPIC).

Hartlepool has a nuclear power station, and there is a conventional CHP power station and a biomass power station operated by Sembcorp on the Wilton chemical site.Hereema Fabrication Group make North Sea platforms at the A1048/A179 roundabout in Hartlepool. 

Wilton Engineering's 50 acre fabrication and maintenance site is in Port Clarence. Barker and Stonehouse make furniture north of Middlesbrough next to the A66/A178 junction. The Teesside Steelworks near Redcar has the biggest blast furnace in Europe and is operated by Sahaviriya Steel Industries (SSI). Tata Steel Europe operate a pipe works at Hartlepool, a heavy beam mill near Middlesbrough and a special sections mill at Skinningrove Steelworks. Able UK operate the biggest dry dock in the UK near Seaton Carew, Hartlepool where ships can be dismantled and oil rigs can be dismantled or refurbished.

The many chemistry-based businesses on Teesside include Huntsman Tioxide plant at Greatham makes titanium dioxide. Huntsman's European headquarters are in Wynyard. Johnson Matthey Catalysts and Fujifilm Dyosynth Biologics have manufacturing units in Billingham while the Lucite International Acrylics factory and the Mitsubishi battery chemical plant are on the other side of the town. Exwold Technology operate their two extrusion and packaging facilities in Hartlepool. Banner Chemicals are adjacent to the A66 in Middlesbrough. Aldous Huxley's visit to the former ICI plant in Billingham inspired Brave New World and this unit now makes fertiliser for Growhow, using 1% of the UK's natural gas. SABIC petrochemicals and polymers, Lotte Chemicals PET and PTA plants, Biffa recycled polymers, Huntsman polyurethanes and the Ensus Biofuels all operate at Wilton. ConocoPhillips refinery, BP Cats, Harvest Energy Biodiesel unit, Greenery Fuels, Fine Organics, Vertelus speciality chemicals and Ineos Nitriles are all based at Seal Sands, with Vopak and Simon Storage tank storage businesses nearby. Air Products are building two waste to energy units at Seal Sands, and Sita are upgrading their unit at Haverton Hill. Marlow Foods produce Quorn, and KP Snacks make McCoy's Crisps in Billingham. Santander UK's mortgages division is located in Thornaby. Tetley Tea have had their only tea bag factory in the UK at Eaglescliffe, in the borough of Stockton-on-Tees, since 1969. It is the largest tea bag factory in the world and makes 18 billion tea bags a year. Its distribution centre is at nearby Newton Aycliffe in County Durham.

Teesport

Teesport is on the River Tees and is currently the third largest port in the United Kingdom, and amongst the ten biggest in Western Europe, in terms of tonnage shipped. Its size is due to the local steel and chemical industries.

This port handles over 56 million tonnes of goods per annum which are mainly associated with the local petrochemical, chemical and steel processing industries. 

The port is an important piece of logistical infrastructure for the NEPIC cluster of process companies. PD Ports, who own Teesport, is headquartered in Middlesbrough adjacent to Middlesbrough railway station.

Landmarks

Transport

Road
Main

Triple-digit roads

Bus

Most of the area is served by Stagecoach's Tees Flex network, a pre-bookable service running in and around the valley, mainly serving Stockton on Tees, Darlington and Redcar and Cleveland. Services are operated by a dedicated fleet of Mercedes-Benz Sprinter minibuses.

Rail
Stations
The stations, by borough, are as follows: 
Darlington:
Hartlepool:
 and 
Stockton-on-Tees:
Middlesbrough:
Redcar and Cleveland:

Lines

  is connected to the East Coast Main Line (ECML)  and provides fast connections to London and Edinburgh. From May 2018, the UK Government announced that the line was to be re-nationalised for the second time since privatisation in 1997. 

 Tees Valley line, serves most of the area and links to Darlington and Teesside Airport Station, with sections being the former Stockton & Darlington Railway. 
Esk Valley line: services most Middlesbrough stations
Services

York-based LNER serves the full length of the ECML and operates most of the stations on the route. Grand Central has linked Teesside with London since December 2007 with a non-stop from York onwards. It does not have electric trains, and uses the Northallerton–Eaglescliffe Line and Durham Coast Line. 

Local-service routes in the Tees Valley are provided by Northern, based in Manchester. TransPennine Express, also based in Manchester, has long-distance services from Middlesbrough to Manchester, via West Yorkshire.

Air
Teesside International Airport serves the area and has a regular service from Amsterdam, Schiphol airport.

Sport

Football

Association

Under the Northern League they is the North Riding Football League, founded in 2017 by a merger of Teesside Football League and the Eskvale & Cleveland League

Wearside League also host North Tees Teams mainly in Division One:
Darlington Railway Athletic at Brinkburn Road, Darlington, County Durham
Norton & Stockton Ancients at Norton Sports Complex, Norton, County Durham
Darlington Town reserve team for Darlington FC, founded in 1908 (As Horden Colliery Welfare) play at Eastbourne Sports Complex, Darlington, County Durham
FC Hartlepool, Hartlepool, County Durham
Wearside League Division two:
Wynyard Village, Wynyard (Stockton), County Durham

Rugby Union
As of the 2022-2 season, there are fourteen Rugby Union Football Clubs in the region, Darlington Mowden Park is in the highest division compared to the rest of the clubs:

Cricket
ECB PL’s North Yorkshire and South Durham Cricket League:

Basketball
Tees Valley Mohawks
Teesside Lions

Uses in local culture

Tees Valley Wildlife Trust
Tees Valley Youth Orchestra

References

External links
 Enjoy Tees Valley
 Tees Valley Combined Authority
 Invest Tees Valley

County Durham
Middlesbrough
North Yorkshire
Stockton-on-Tees
Redcar and Cleveland
Darlington
Hartlepool
Places in the Tees Valley
Local enterprise partnerships